Andrew Colin Murphy (born 18 October 1966) is an English former professional footballer who played in the Football League as a midfielder.

References

1966 births
Living people
Footballers from Preston, Lancashire
English footballers
Association football midfielders
Preston North End F.C. players
English Football League players